The Kh-28 (Nisan-28; NATO: AS-9 'Kyle') was the first Soviet anti-radiation missile for tactical aircraft. It entered production in 1973 and is still carried on some Sukhoi Su-22s in developing countries but is no longer in Russian service. Use of the Kh-28 was restricted by its weight, limited seeker head, bulk and fuelling requirements, and it was superseded by the smaller, solid-fuel Kh-58 (AS-11 'Kilter') in the early 1980s.

Development
Soviet offensive doctrine in the early 1960s assumed that widespread use of nuclear weapons would disable Western radar-based air defence systems through electromagnetic pulses (EMP) effects. Consequently, they paid little attention to the development of anti-radar missiles. However, in January 1963 the Berezniak design bureau (which became MKB Raduga in 1967) was tasked with developing such a missile as part of the K-28P weapon complex based around a 'Wild Weasel' version of the Yak-28 'Brewer' bomber (hence -28; the 'K' stands for kompleks, P stands for protivradiolokatsyonny 'anti-radar').

The main difficulty came in the design of the APR-28 guidance system undertaken by CKB-111 (later NPO Avtomatika). This meant that the Kh-28 missile was not ready until the 1970s. Flight trials were carried out on a Yak-28N, but by then the Yak-28 had ceased production and was perceived as obsolete, and the K-28P system was cancelled. Instead the Kh-28 was adapted for use by standard attack aircraft, in particular the Su-24 'Fencer-A' and Su-17M 'Fitter-C'.

Design
The Kh-28 was the first liquid-fuel Soviet anti-radiation missile and was quickly replaced by the solid-fuel Kh-58 missile, according to research from Dr. Carlo Kopp, the editor in chief of Air Power Australia.

The design of the Kh-28 was similar to – but smaller than – Raduga's Kh-22 (AS-4 'Kitchen') and KSR-5 (AS-6 'Kingfish') anti-shipping missiles. The Su-24 could carry one under each wing, and used the onboard Filin ('Eagle Owl') targeting system. The Su-17M could only carry one Kh-28 on the centreline, and used the Myetyel/Metel ('Blizzard') system in a pod under the right wing, later replaced by the Vyuga ('Snowstorm') pod.

The APR-28 seeker on the original Kh-28 could only target the MIM-14 Nike-Hercules and English Electric Thunderbird SAM systems, although the Filin could recognise other frequencies. The Kh-28M had an updated X-band seeker that could recognise the MIM-23 Hawk's AN/MPQ-33 and subsequent AN/MPQ-39 target-illumination radars, and the AN/MPQ-34 low-level target-acquisition radar. Other seekers may have been produced.

The propulsion system consists of a fuel tank and a separate tank for the red fuming nitric acid (RFNA) oxidiser. One problem was that the missile required fuelling just before flight, and not many airfields had the appropriate facilities. Range is given variously as 80–95 km or 120 km.

Operational history
The Kh-28 entered service with the Soviet Air Force in 1973, and has been widely exported. It was cleared for use on the Su-17M/Su-20/Su-22M, Su-24M, Tupolev Tu-16, Mikoyan-Gurevich MiG-25BM, MiG-27 and Tupolev Tu-22M aircraft. It was also tested on an Antonov An-12BL SEAD variant of the transport that could carry four of the missiles.
A missile believed to be a Kh-28 was captured in Iraq by US forces during the first Gulf War in April 1991. One man was burnt by RFNA  from the oxidiser tank while he was making it safe.

Operators 
 
 
 
 

 others
  from  aviation arsenals
 
  unknown, active or depot in stockage or not operational
  unknown, maybe active or on depot stockage
  unknown status or not operational
  unknown, probably active or stockage in depot

Former operators 
  passed on to successor states

Variants
 Kh-28 (Izdeliye 93, D-8) - original version targeting Nike-Hercules and Thunderbird SAMs
 Kh-28M - improved version capable against Hawk and possibly other radars
 Kh-28E - export version
 Nisan-28 or Nissan-28 - Iraqi version of Kh-28E displayed in Baghdad in 1989 that was reported to have three seeker heads for different frequency bands.

Similar weapons
 AGM-78 Standard ARM – US anti-radar missile with similar range but only Mach 2.0
 Martel missile AS37 – Anglo-French first-generation anti-radar missile, subsonic with 60 km range

Notes

References
 
 
 
 

Kh-028
Kh-028
Cold War air-to-surface missiles of the Soviet Union
Kh-028
Kh-028
MKB Raduga products
Anti-radiation missiles of the Cold War
Military equipment introduced in the 1970s